The Dark House (lit. Back to the Coast) is a 2009 Dutch thriller film based on a novel by Saskia Noort.

Cast 
 Linda de Mol - Maria
 Ariane Schluter - Ans
 Pierre Bokma - Rechercheur Van Wijk
 Huub Stapel - Victor Terpstra
 Daan Schuurmans - Geert
 Koen De Bouw - Harry

References

External links 

2009 thriller films
2009 films
Dutch thriller films